El chiringuito de Jugones is a Spanish television program of football debate in which the current affairs of the main teams of the Spanish league are discussed, essentially FC Barcelona and Real Madrid CF. To a lesser extent, other teams such as Atlético de Madrid, Sevilla FC, Valencia CF or Athletic Club, among others, are discussed. In addition, international football and, occasionally, Spanish futsal and basketball are also discussed.

The program is broadcast from Sunday to Thursday from 00:00 to 02:45 on Mega, a channel belonging to the Atresmedia group, except for some specials such as the death of Diego Armando Maradona  or the departure of Lionel Messi which were broadcast on La Sexta. It's presented by Josep Pedrerol, and accompanied by a group of commentators. The program is rebroadcast daily from 06:20 to 09:00 on Mega.

History 
El chiringuito is directed by sports journalist Josep Pedrerol, following the same format, technical team and collaborators of the program Punto pelota, which he presented at Intereconomía.

Thus, Pedrerol reached an agreement with Atresmedia, on December 20, 2013 to begin broadcasting the program on January 6, 2014. In addition, it was confirmed that the program would be broadcast through Nitro and would be called El chiringuito de Jugones, thus boosting the brand of La Sexta s sports program called Jugones, becoming the most watched program in the late night slot on DTT channels, as well as the leading program on Nitro, having doubled the channel's audience share since its premiere.

On May 5, 2014, due to the closure of the Nitro channel, the program went on air through La Sexta, taking advantage of the start of the 2014 World Cup, so it changed its name to El chiringuito del mundial. In its beginnings on La Sexta it was broadcast after En el Aire around 1:30 and sometimes even at 2:00, under the name Chiringuito after hours.

After the end of the World Cup and in view of the 2014-2015 television season, El Chiringuito de Jugones changed channels again, recovering its original name. Thus, Neox broadcast the program between August 18, 2014 and July 9, 2015.

However, after the creation of Atresmedia's Mega channel, aimed at the same audience (mainly male) as the first channel where the program was broadcast (Nitro), El chiringuito de Jugones moved its broadcasts to this channel on August 10, 2015. In the early hours of June 8, 2018, the program celebrated its 1,000th broadcast, gathering the entire team on the set.

Since February 9, 2020, the program has been broadcast on Multimedios Televisión in México. In 2021, Fox Deportes en los Estados Unidos in the United States began broadcasting the program live at 7:00 Eastern Time in North America, as it airs in España on Mega. The program is also rebroadcast in radio format on a number of Spanish local radio stations.It is also rebroadcast daily from 6:20 a.m. to 9:00 a.m. in Spain on Mega.

Criticisms and controversies 
The program has been criticized, even by the program's own hosts, for being a madridist program, manipulative and having "turned more into an attack of harassment and demolition of  Barça", being described by José Mara Garca as "a filth", and "the worst space in all of journalism", even being referenced, for its style, as the "Sálvame del fútbol" or the "Sálvame del deporte."

Reality TV 
The program has been the protagonist of episodes close to reality show, where there have been: resignations of live talk show hosts; physical aggressions; death threats; abandonment of the live set due to anger; live reality TV broadcasts; personal sexist attacks; confrontations between talk show hosts or anxiety attacks broadcast live.

Some of these situations have already occurred in Punto pelota, where confessions about private matters not related to sports; physical aggression; abandonment of the set during live broadcasts; personal macho attacks; and emotional reconciliations among the panelists were heard.

Extrasports controversies 
El Chiringuito talk show hosts Edu Aguirre and Pipi Estrada were accused on social networks of bringing drugs to the set of the program, consuming illegal substances during the broadcast or appearing on the program under the effects of narcotic substances when during the live broadcast of the program they were seen to drop papers from their pockets to the floor of the television set. Both journalists denied these accusations, answering that they were tissues. In addition, Edu Aguirre added that he will take legal action against the people who have accused him of carrying narcotic substances.

In May 2020, another one of the talk show hosts, Edwin Congo, was arrested in a police operation related to drug trafficking and released after being questioned.

François Gallardo, a talk show host, was arrested on charges of alleged fraud for impersonating a FIFA agent and subsequently sentenced to two years in prison.

Format 
The program starts around midnight with a short editorial commentary by Josep Pedrerol, detailing the contents of the program of the day; Sandra Daz Arcas, who is the voice of the viewer, encourages audience participation through Twitter, reading comments from the program's followers. Next, the team of commentators who will be present that night are introduced and, as they enter the set, the tune "Vive deportivamente," from Los 2 Españoles, starts to play.

During the program, the different panelists comment and give their opinions on the different topics proposed, all set to background music that guides the viewer in the direction of the debate. In addition, the talk show is complemented with speeches and emotional reflections in close-up by some of the panelists, reports, interviews, summaries of the meetings, "exclusives," social networks, and sometimes live musical performances by artists little known to the general public.

The program ends with Fernando Fu's "No sería fácil" in the background, giving way to the credits and the departure of the collaborators from the set.

Emissions 
The first season was broadcast on Nitro, from January 6, 2014, to May 1, 2014. The second season was broadcast on La Sexta from May 5, 2014, to July 17, 2014. The third season was broadcast on Neox between August 18, 2014, and July 9, 2015. Finally, the program has been broadcast on Mega since its fourth season, which premiered on August 10, 2015.

Although the format is usually broadcast from Sunday to Thursday between 00:00 and 02:45, previously, with its transfer from Nitro to La Sexta, the space had timetable fluctuations, starting to be broadcast some days at its usual time, other days at 01:30. There were even broadcasts that began at 02:00, finishing at the same time.

On occasions, El Chiringuito has not hesitated to bring its schedule to prime-time, due to important events. They also make live broadcasts in matches of great relevance, such as El Clasico or Champions League qualifiers, although occasionally they have also broadcast live in less relevant matches, such as Real Valladolid-Real Madrid which ended 1-4 in favor of Madrid. When Real Madrid won the tenth UEFA Champions League in 2014, the program started at 00:00 and ended at 06:30. In 2016, when Real Madrid won the UEFA Champions League for the eleventh time, the program began broadcasting at 00:30 and ended at 08:00. In 2017 and 2018, with the UEFA Champions League finals in the background, the program, apart from broadcasting previous UEFA Champions League finals won by Real Madrid, had special evening broadcasts. On the occasion of the Ballon d'Or election, the program broadcasts a special edition, which includes the gala broadcast. Special programs were broadcast for all Spanish derbies and Madrid derbies. There were also special World Cup programs, such as Spain-Russia, in which "la Roja" was eliminated after losing in a penalty shootout.On October 17, 2019, the program was broadcast from Málaga.

Pier Cherubino, Julen Lopetegui, Santiago Solari, Álvaro Arbeloa, Paco Jémez, Florentino Pérez, Hugo Sánchez, among others, have been invited to participate in the program.

Current team 
Presenter

Viewer's voice

 Sandra Díaz Arcas (2017–present)

Tertulians

Editors

Correspondents

Former team 
Viewer's voice

Tertulians

Editors

Correspondents

Publishers

Hearings

References

External links 
 El Chiringuito on Twitter

Spanish television shows
2014 Spanish television series debuts